The Provincial Committee for Serbia or Provincial Committee of Serbia (Покрајински комитет Србије/Pokrajinski komitet Srbije), abbreviated PKS/ПКС, was the branch of the Communist Party of Yugoslavia (KPJ) active in Serbia during the Kingdom of Yugoslavia and German-occupied Serbia during World War II. It was transformed into the Communist Party of Serbia in 8 May 1945.

History

Kingdom of Yugoslavia

World War II
On 4 July 1941, the PKS established the Main Staff of the National Liberation Army and Partisan Detachments of Serbia. 

In 1941, the PKS greatly aided the communists in western Serbia. Communist Party members were sent to areas in need of political activity. The Central Committee for Liberated Territory was established in the short-lived Republic of Užice in western German-occupied Serbia.  The reformed Provincial Committee for Serbia, set up in November 1942, established 12 new county- and district committees.

References

Sources

Communism in Serbia
Serbia in World War II
Defunct organizations based in Serbia
1930s establishments in Serbia
1945 disestablishments in Serbia
Yugoslav Serbia
Organizations based in Yugoslavia
Socialism in the Kingdom of Yugoslavia